Ghindești is a commune in Florești District, Moldova. It is composed of four villages: Ghindești, Hîrtop, Țîra and Țîra station.

References

Communes of Florești District